Hypersensitivity (also called hypersensitivity reaction or intolerance)  refers to undesirable reactions produced by the normal immune system, including allergies and autoimmunity. They are usually referred to as an over-reaction of the immune system and these reactions may be damaging and uncomfortable. This is an immunologic term and is not to be confused with the psychiatric term of being hypersensitive which implies to an individual who may be overly sensitive to physical (i.e. sound, touch, light, etc.) and/or emotional stimuli. 
Hypersensitivity reactions can be classified into four types.

Type I: IgE mediated immediate reaction

Type II: Antibody-mediated reaction (IgG or IgM antibodies)

Type III: Immune complex-mediated reaction

Type IV: Cytotoxic, cell-mediated, delayed hypersensitivity reaction

The first three types are considered immediate hypersensitivity reactions because they occur within 24 hours. The fourth type is considered a delayed hypersensitivity reaction because it usually occurs more than 12 hours after exposure to the allergen, with a maximal reaction time between 48 and 72 hours.

Gell and Coombs classification
The Gell and Coombs classification of hypersensitivity is the most widely used, and distinguishes four types of immune response which result in bystander tissue damage.

Type I hypersensitivity

Etiology 

Type I hypersensitivity occurs as a result of exposure to an antigen. The response to the antigen occurs in two stages: the sensitization and the effect stage. In the "sensitization" stage, the host experiences an asymptomatic contact with the antigen. Subsequently, in the "effect" period, the pre-sensitized host is re-introduced to the antigen, which then leads to a type I anaphylactic or atopic immune response.

Types of antigens involved 
 Food: nuts, eggs, soy, wheat, shellfish, etc.
 Animal source: bee, wasp, cats, insects, rats, etc.
 Environmental factors: dust mites, latex, pollen, mold, etc.
 Atopic diseases: allergic asthma, allergic rhinitis, conjunctivitis, dermatitis, etc.
 Medication-induced reactions: antibiotics

Type II hypersensitivity 

Type II hypersensitivity reaction refers to an antibody-mediated immune reaction in which antibodies (IgG or IgM) are directed against cellular or extracellular matrix antigens with the resultant cellular destruction, functional loss, or damage to tissues.

Damage can be accomplished via three different mechanisms:
 Antibody binding to cell surface receptors and altering its activity
 Activation of the complement pathway.
 Antibody-dependent cellular cytotoxicity.

The pathophysiology of type II hypersensitivity reactions can be broadly classified into three types:
 Cell depletion or destruction without inflammation
 Inflammation mediated by complement or Fc receptor
 Cellular dysfunction by antibodies

The process involves a series of immune-mediated events that might take different forms.

Type III hypersensitivity 

In type III hypersensitivity reaction, an abnormal immune response is mediated by the formation of antigen-antibody aggregates called "immune complexes". They can precipitate in various tissues such as skin, joints, vessels, or glomeruli, and trigger the classical complement pathway. Complement activation leads to the recruitment of inflammatory cells (monocytes and neutrophils) that release lysosomal enzymes and free radicals at the site of immune complexes, causing tissue damage.

The most common diseases involving a type III hypersensitivity reaction are serum sickness, post-streptococcal glomerulonephritis, systemic lupus erythematosus, farmers' lung (hypersensitivity pneumonitis), and rheumatoid arthritis.

The principal feature that separates type III reactions from other hypersensitivity reactions is that in type III reaction, the antigen-antibody complexes are pre-formed in the circulation before their deposition in tissues.

Type IV hypersensitivity 

Type IV hypersensitivity reactions are, to some extent, normal physiological events that help fight infections, and dysfunction in this system can predispose to multiple opportunistic infections. Adverse events can also occur due to these reactions when an undesirable interaction between the immune system and an allergen happens.

Pathophysiology 
A Type IV hypersensitivity reaction is mediated by T cells that provoke an inflammatory reaction against exogenous or endogenous antigens. In certain situations, other cells, such as monocytes, eosinophils, and neutrophils, can be involved. After antigen exposure, an initial local immune and inflammatory response occurs that attracts leukocytes. The antigen engulfed by the macrophages and monocytes is presented to T cells, which then becomes sensitized and activated. These cells then release cytokines and chemokines, which can cause tissue damage and may result in illnesses.

Examples of illnesses resulting from type IV hypersensitivity reactions include contact dermatitis and drug hypersensitivity. Type IV reactions are further subdivided into type IVa, IVb, IVc, and IVd based on the type of T cell (Th1, Th17 and CTLs) involved and the cytokines/chemokines produced.

Delayed hypersensitivity plays a crucial role in our body's ability to fight various intracellular pathogens such as mycobacteria and fungi. They also play a principal role in tumor immunity and transplant rejection. Since patients with acquired immunodeficiency syndrome (AIDS) have a progressive decline in the number of CD4 cells, they also have a defective type four hypersensitivity reaction.

Treatment

Immediate hypersensitivity reactions 
The treatment of immediate hypersensitivity reactions includes the management of anaphylaxis with intramuscular adrenaline (epinephrine), oxygen, intravenous (IV) antihistamine, support blood pressure with IV fluids, avoid latex gloves and equipment in patients who are allergic, and surgical procedures such as tracheotomy if there is severe laryngeal edema.

 Allergic bronchial asthma can be treated with any of the following: inhaled short- and long-acting bronchodilators (anticholinergics) along with inhaled corticosteroids, leukotriene antagonists, use of disodium cromoglycate, and environmental control. Experimentally, a low dose of methotrexate or cyclosporin and omalizumab (a monoclonal anti-IgE antibody) has been used.
 Treatment of autoimmune disorders (e.g., SLE) include one or a combination of NSAIDs and hydroxychloroquine, azathioprine, methotrexate, mycophenolate, cyclophosphamide, low dose IL-2, intravenous immunoglobulins, and belimumab.
 Omalizumab is a monoclonal antibody that interacts with the binding site of the high-affinity IgE receptor on mast cells. It is an engineered, humanized recombinant immunoglobulin. Moderate to severe allergic bronchial asthma can improve with omalizumab.

Delayed hypersensitivity reactions 
Treatment of type 4 HR involves the treatment of the eliciting cause.

 The most common drugs to treat tuberculosis include isoniazid, rifampin, ethambutol, and pyrazinamide. For drug-resistant TB, a combination of antibiotics such as amikacin, kanamycin, or capreomycin should be used.
 The most common drugs to treat leprosy include rifampicin and clofazimine in combination with dapsone for multibacillary leprosy. A single dose of antimicrobial combination to cure single lesion paucibacillary leprosy comprises ofloxacin, rifampicin, and minocycline.
 Praziquantel can be useful for treating infections caused by all Schistosoma species.
 Hydroxychloroquine and chloroquine can use in the therapy of sarcoidosis involving the skin, lungs, and the nervous system.
 The use of anti-TNF monoclonal antibodies such as adalimumab and certolizumab have been approved for Crohn disease.

References

External links 

 
Allergology
Effects of external causes

de:Überempfindlichkeitsreaktion